Robert J. Krist (born March 29, 1957) is an American politician who served as the Nebraska State Senator from the 10th district from 2009 to 2019. A member of the Republican Party until 2017, his district includes Bennington and part of Omaha. Krist joined the Democratic Party in 2018; he was its nominee for Governor of Nebraska in the 2018 election.

Personal life
Krist was born in Omaha, Nebraska. In 1980, he married Margaret Mary O'Connor.

Education
Krist graduated with honors from Creighton Preparatory School in Omaha, Nebraska, in 1975. He attended the University of St. Thomas in Saint Paul, Minnesota, where he received a Bachelor of Arts degree in sociology in 1979. He obtained a Master of Arts degree in business administration and human relations from Webster University in St. Louis, Missouri in 1982.

Military career
Krist served in the United States Air Force from 1979 to 2000 and retired as a lieutenant colonel.  During his stint in the Air Force, Krist held key leadership positions directing critical missions including the high visibility Looking Glass mission at Offutt Air Force Base in Bellevue, Nebraska. He scheduled operations and flew missions on the  Looking Glass EC-135 aircraft, which was the Airborne Command Post for Strategic Air Command.

Among other operations, Krist served in both Operation Desert Shield and Desert Storm. In 1998, he was chosen as an Active Duty Air Force Advisor to then-Nebraska Governor Ben Nelson and the Adjutant General of Nebraska.

In 2014, Krist was inducted into the Nebraska Aviation Hall of Fame. In 2017, the Secretary of State of Nebraska, John Gale, appointed him to serve on the Honor a Veteran Honorary Steering Committee.

Nebraska Legislature
Krist was appointed to the Nebraska Legislature by Governor Dave Heineman on September 11, 2009, to replace Senator Mike Friend. He won election to the office in 2010 and was reelected in 2014. Krist represented the 10th Legislative District, an area encompassing some of the northwest portion of Omaha, the entire city of Bennington and a north-central portion of Douglas County. In 2015, senators elected him Chairman of the Executive Board of the Legislative Council and he also served as Chairman of the Referencing Committee.

His standing committee assignments in the Legislature include the Judiciary Committee, the Agriculture Committee, and the General Affairs Committee. He also serves on the Rules Committee and the Justice Reinvestment Oversight Committee.

2018 gubernatorial campaign

In 2017, Krist expressed interest in running for the governorship of Nebraska in 2018. He initially indicated that he might run against incumbent Pete Ricketts in the Republican primary. In July 2017, he stated that he would run as a third-party candidate and that he would remain a Republican until the end of his term in the Nebraska Legislature. In September 2017, Krist announced his candidacy; he stated that he would change his party registration to "nonpartisan" later that day. In February 2018, he changed his registration to the Democratic Party and said he would run for that party's gubernatorial nomination.

Krist won the primary election on May 15, 2018, defeating two other candidates. He was defeated in the general election on November 6, 2018 by Ricketts, with 41% of the vote against Ricketts's 59%.

Occupation
Krist is currently the Contract Manager for the United States Army Corps of Engineers Northwest Division Aviation Program. He has served as a pilot since 2000 and the Chief Pilot since 2002.  The Division Aircraft is based at Offutt Air Force Base in the Omaha District and also services the Kansas City, Missouri, Portland, Oregon, Seattle, Washington and Walla Walla, Washington districts.

Electoral history

2018

See also
 List of American politicians who switched parties in office

References

External links
Official Nebraska Legislature profile with Unicameral Update news
Bob Krist for Governor campaign website

Financial information at OpenSecrets
 "Sen. Krist ready to soar to new heights", Unicameral Update Nebraska Legislature website, November 10, 2009
 "Governor names Krist to fill legislative seat" Lincoln Journal-Star, AP, September 11, 2009
 "Bill: Cancer study will use Nebraska vets" Lincoln Journal-Star, Nancy Hicks, February 3, 2010
 "Nebraska budget bills advance in the Legislature" Lincoln Journal-Star, JoAnne Young, March 18, 2010 

1957 births
21st-century American politicians
Living people
Nebraska Democrats
Nebraska Independents
Nebraska Republicans
Nebraska state senators
Politicians from Omaha, Nebraska
Recipients of the Air Medal
Candidates in the 2018 United States elections